The Suspended Vocation is a 1978 French drama film directed by Chilean filmmaker Raúl Ruiz. It is a free adaptation of the perverse theological 1950 novel of the same name by Pierre Klossowski.

Plot
The film centers on a Dominican monk named Jérôme (played by one actor in colour and another actor in black-and-white) and his interactions with various higher-ups within the French Catholic Church.

Cast 

 Didier Flamand as Jérôme # 1
 Pascal Bonitzer as Jérôme # 2
 Daniel Gélin as Malagrida
 Édith Scob as Angélique
 Gabriel Gascon as The father-confessor
 Geneviève Mnich as Sister Théophile
 Maurice Bénichou as Member of the Devotion # 1
 Pascal Kané as The member of Devotion # 2
 Alexandre Tamar as Member of Devotion # 3
 Jean Badin as L'ami
 Huguette Faget as The Seller of Statues
 Jean Rougeul as Euthanasien Persienne
 Françoise Vercruyssen as The Woman
 Jean Lescot as The Father-Master # 1
 Marcel Imhoff as The Father-Master # 2
 Daniel Isoppo as The lay brother
 Isidro Romero as The Prior # 1
 Gérard Berner as The Prior # 2
 Éric Burnelli as The Painter Brother
 Jean-Robert Viard as Bishop (as Jean Robert Viard)
 Paul-Eric Shulmann as Child (as Paul-Eroc Schulman)
 Sylvie Herbert as Sister Vincent
 Raoul Guillet as The Superior
 Jean Frapat as The black abbot

References

External links

1978 films
1978 drama films
French drama films
1970s French-language films
Films directed by Raúl Ruiz
French black-and-white films
1970s French films